The Dairy Council is a British organisation founded in 1920 to promote the widespread consumption of milk in the UK, and advocate its health benefits.

History
It was founded on 24 February 1920, and incorporated on 4 February 1925 as the National Milk Publicity Council, situated on Southampton Street, London. From 1983 until 2001 it was known as the National Dairy Council.

During WWII it had to curtail its activities as milk was heavily rationed. Sale of milk in the UK was three pints per head each week in 1939, rising to five pints in 1951.

Structure
It is situated in Holborn, west of Holborn tube station, next door to the Food Standards Agency in the offices of Dairy UK. Sodexo UK & Ireland is on the opposite side of High Holborn. It is a subsidiary of Dairy UK.

Function
It produced slogans to consume milk such as drinka pinta milka day in the 1950s. It placed large adverts in national newspapers.

See also
 Dairy industry in the United Kingdom
 List of countries by milk consumption per capita

References

External links
 Dairy Council

1920 establishments in the United Kingdom
Dairy farming in the United Kingdom
Dairy organizations
Health education in the United Kingdom
Health education organizations
Health in the London Borough of Camden
Organisations based in the London Borough of Camden
Organizations established in 1920